Rodrigues College is a secondary school for both girls and boys. It is located in Port Mathurin, Rodrigues. It is the first ecumenical educational institution on the Indian Ocean.

History

Rodrigues College celebrated its 30th anniversary during the year 2004. It originated from the merger of the St. Louis and St. Barnabas Colleges in 1973. Rodrigues Island has a small population and during the early seventies it was difficult to run two colleges with few students and resources.

St. Louis College was a Roman Catholic school and St. Barnabas was administered by the Anglican diocese of Mauritius. During the month of August 1973, the then managers of both institutions met and decided on a merger as a final solution to save both schools.

Since that time, Rodrigues College has grown into a popular educational institution and has educated a large portion of the Rodriguan population.

The motto of the college is ‘Sapienta Et Fortitudo,’ meaning ‘Wisdom and Strength.' Students wear a green and white uniform along with the college badge.

Notable alumni
 Johnson Roussety, former chief commissioner of Rodrigues

See also
 List of secondary schools in Mauritius 
 Education in Mauritius

External links
Rodrigues College website

Schools in Mauritius
Educational institutions established in 1973
Buildings and structures in Rodrigues
1973 establishments in Mauritius